Gaetano Vastola (born 10 May 1978) is an Italian football player, who plays as defender for S.S. Racing Club Fondi.

Career
In the past he played with  Scafatese, Giugliano, Narnese, Maceratese, Salernitana, Avellino, Ascoli Calcio 1898 and Gallipoli Calcio.

References

External links
 

1978 births
Living people
People from Pompei
Italian footballers
S.S. Scafatese Calcio 1922 players
S.S.C. Giugliano players

S.S. Maceratese 1922 players
U.S. Viterbese 1908 players
U.S. Avellino 1912 players
Ascoli Calcio 1898 F.C. players
U.S. Salernitana 1919 players
A.S.D. Gallipoli Football 1909 players
S.S. Virtus Lanciano 1924 players
S.S. Racing Club Roma players
S.S. Racing Club Fondi players
Serie A players
Serie B players
Association football defenders
Sportspeople from the Province of Naples
Footballers from Campania